Technology journalism is the activity, or product, of journalists engaged in the preparation of written, visual, audio or multi-media material intended for dissemination through public  media, focusing on technology-related subjects. Technology journalism includes genres such as news, reports, and analysis covering a wide variety of topics, including communications technologies, the Internet, social media, the IT industry, scientific research, robotics, and laws and policy regarding the digital world. One common genre of technology journalism, the product review, may involve the journalist experimenting with and expressing opinions about specific devices or applications, often accompanied by a score in percentage or number out of 5.

Technology journalists 
As a job function, technology journalists write for consumers who are interested in things like smartphone, tablets, laptops and other digital products. The other part of technology journalism is enterprise technology, which talks about how businesses leverage new technologies for business gains. Technology journalists usually interview experts on various fields like mobility, analytics, cloud computing, open source, etc. and share insights with their audience.

See also 

 Environmental journalism
 Public awareness of science
 Scientific literature

Journalism by field